

The Moonee Ponds Creek Trail is a shared use path for cyclists and pedestrians, which follows the Moonee Ponds Creek through the northern suburbs of Melbourne, Victoria, Australia.

Following the path
The path commences in Melbourne Docklands on Footscray Road near where the creek enters the Yarra River. The lower reaches of the path are also the route of the Capital City Trail.

The path then follows the creek, snaking under and around the Tullamarine Freeway for several kilometres. There is a short on road section through Essendon along Vanberg Road. After Bell Street it leaves the Tullamarine Freeway and heads north on the east side of Essendon Airport through a series of parks, including Boeing and Kingsford Smith Ulm reserves. Passing under the large rail trestle bridge, the trail soon arrives at the Western Ring Road and the Western Ring Road Trail.

1.3 km along to the north is Jacana Reserve, near Johnstone Street. By crossing a small footbridge here, one arrives at the south end of the Broadmeadows Valley and the south end of the Broadmeadows Valley Trail.

Continuing on the Moonee Ponds Creek Trail leads to Willowbrook Reserve near Mickleham Road, in Westmeadows. West of Willowbrook Reserve, the path continues along the fence line of the Woodlands Historic Park, home of Living Legends.

Landmarks
Tullamarine Freeway
Moonee Ponds Creek
Melbourne Docklands
Melbourne Airport

Connections
The trail intersects the Broadmeadows Valley Trail in the north. Nearby it also intersects the Western Ring Road Trail and meets the Capital City Trail in the south.

Heading east 1 km along the Western Ring Road Trail will take you to Jacana station and further still to the Merri Creek Trail at Fawkner. Heading west along the Western Ring Road Trail will lead you to Brimbank Park and the Maribyrnong River Trail.

References 

Bike rides around Melbourne 3rd edition, 2009, Julia Blunden, Open Spaces Publishing, 
 Bike Paths Victoria sixth edition, 2004. Edited and published by Sabey & Associates Pty Ltd. pp126.

External links
 An interactive map of the trail as well as others in the Melbourne area is available here: Walking and Cycling Trails in Melbourne
Parks Victoria - Woodlands Historic Park

Bike paths in Melbourne
Essendon, Victoria